Cosley Zoo is an AZA-accredited zoo located in Wheaton, Illinois. It is a facility of the Wheaton Park District and open year-round.

The zoo holds various youth-directed programs, including Junior Zookeepers, birthday parties and holiday events.

Local Impact 
Cosley Zoo and the Willowbrook Wildlife Center have teamed up in an effort to increase the population of the endangered Blanding's turtle. Eggs are incubated and hatched at the Willowbrook Wildlife Center, where the baby turtles also spend their first year of life. Their second year is spent at Cosley Zoo, and then they are released into the wild. The program has helped to release 2,100 turtles since 1996.

Species list

Birds 

American kestrel, Black-crowned night heron, Blue jay, Swedish blue duck, Cayuga duck, Cedar waxwing, Chicken, Common barn owl, Crested duck, Eastern bluebird, Eastern Screech Owl, Great Horned Owl, Hahn's macaw, Hairy Woodpecker, Hermit Thrush, India Blue Peafowl, Indian Runner Duck, Khaki Campbell Duck, Killdeer, North American Wood Duck, Northern Cardinal, Northern Flicker, Northern Pintail Duck, Orpington Duck, Red-tailed Hawk, Redhead Duck, Ringed Turtle Dove, Rose-breasted Grosbeak, Rouen Duck, Sandhill Crane, Tennessee Warbler, Turkey Vulture, Veery, White Pekin Duck

Invertebrates 

Chaco Golden Knee Tarantula, Common Walking Stick, Madagascar Hissing Cockroach, Vietnamese Walking Stick

Mammals 

African Pygmy Hedgehog, Black Angus Cow, Coyote, Guernsey Cow, Guinea Hog, Himalayan Rabbit, Llama, Miniature Donkey, Montadale Sheep, Norwegian Fjord Horse, Nubian Goat, Raccoon, Red Fox, Shetland Pony, White-tailed Deer

Reptiles 

Black Rat Snake, Blanding's turtle, Common bull snake, Eastern Blue-tongued Skink, Eastern Milk Snake, Fox snake, Midland Painted Turtle, Three-toed Box Turtle

History 
On November 9, 1973, Paula Jones donated 2.65 acres of land in honor of relative Harvey Cosley. It opened as Cosley's Children's Park and Museum in August 1974. In 1975, the zoo acquired a retired caboose that sat next to the former train station. The zoo gained enough funding to expand by 2 acres in 1976. In the same year, the park changed its name to Cosley Animal Farm and Museum. In 1987, the Vern Keibler Learning Center was completed. The zoo continued adding exhibits and updating old ones to more natural-looking habitats. In 1999, the zoo staff and the Wheaton Park District decided to give the park its current name, Cosley Zoo. In 2000, the Zoo received accreditation by the Association of Zoos and Aquariums. It started its work with the DuPage County Forest Preserve District to rehabilitate Illinois' Blanding's Turtle population in the same year. In 2008, Cosley Zoo worked with an Eagle Scout to turn the old caboose shell into an interactive learning exhibit.

References

External links 
 

Zoos in Illinois
Buildings and structures in Wheaton, Illinois
Tourist attractions in DuPage County, Illinois